Claudia Johnson may refer to:

 Lady Bird Johnson (Claudia Alta Taylor Johnson, 1912–2007),  First Lady of the United States during the presidency of her husband Lyndon B. Johnson
 Claudia L. Johnson, American professor of English literature 
 Claudia Durst Johnson, literary scholar